Nisia Aigaiou, Kriti, meaning "Aegean Islands, Crete", is a first level NUTS administrative division of Greece created for statistical purposes by the European Union. The NUTS division is not used by Greece for any administrative reasons. It contains the three administrative regions of North Aegean, South Aegean, and Crete. As of 1 January 2019 it had a population of 1,200,055 inhabitants.

Per January 2015, the Greek NUTS regions have been redefined. The first-level region of Nisia Aigaiou, Kriti however wasn't changed.

References 

NUTS 1 statistical regions of Greece
Aegean Sea